Hippeastrum ferreyrae is a flowering perennial herbaceous bulbous plant, in the family Amaryllidaceae, native to Peru.

Description
Hippeastrum ferreyrae is considered an endangered species according to the IUCN (1997).

Taxonomy 
The species was first described and named by Hamilton Paul Traub in 1950 as Amaryllis ferreyrae. It was transferred to the genus Hippeastrum by Roy Emile Gereau and Lois Brako in 1993.

References

Sources 
 
 GBIF: Hippeastrum ferreyrae

Flora of South America
ferreyrae
Garden plants of South America
Plants described in 1950